Jean Éric Milazar (born June 1, 1975) is a Mauritian athlete competing in the 200 metres and 400 metres. He was born in Rodrigues and currently resides in Coromandel, Mauritius. He is married to Natacha Ramen-Milazar since 2006 an ex volleyball player and together they have two kids Ericson and Erica.

He is the national record holder in the 400m (44.69), the 300m (32.57), the 200m indoor (21.24) and the 400m indoor (46.28). He also co-holds the Mauritian records in the 4 × 100 m relay (38.99) and the 4 × 400 m relay (3:06:21). Milazar also competes in the 200 metres and is the second fastest 200 metres sprinter in Mauritius with a time of 20.66 behind Stephan Buckland's 20.06. Milazar is one of the best sportsman in Mauritius and he has represented his country in numerous international athletics events such as the Olympic Games and the IAAF World Championships in Athletics. Milazar is one of the best 400m sprinters in Africa since he has won three consecutive African champion titles at the African Championships in 2000, 2002, 2004 and is the first African athlete in history to achieve that. He eventually reached the final in the 400m at the World Championships, in Edmonton, Alberta, Canada finishing fourth in a time of 45.13. Two years later, at the Paris World Championships, Milazar again reached the final finishing seventh in 45.17. However, the International Association of Athletics Federations (IAAF) promoted him to fifth place after the disqualification of Americans Jerome Young and Calvin Harrison due to doping offences. As such, Milazar won his semifinal race in a time of 44.75, the second best time of the semifinals behind Tyree Washington's 44.60.

After his return from the Paris World Championships, Milazar produced an impressive winning streak at the Indian Ocean Island Games in Mauritius. He won three gold medals and one silver. He finished first in the 400 metres smashing the Games' record clocking 45.78. He also won the 4 × 100 m and the 4 × 400 m relay. He finished second in the 200 metres behind Stephan Buckland. His time was 21.07 seconds.

In 2006, Eric Milazar got the Chikungunya disease which was a very serious pandemic in Mauritius. As a result, he became physically weak and his performances in the 400m were quite poor. He struggled at the 2006 African Championships and in the 2006 Commonwealth Games held in Melbourne, Australia. The following year was also a big struggle as he only finished fourth in the 400m heats at the 2007 World Athletics Championships in Osaka. But, these failures only encouraged him to train harder and gain his confidence back to start setting the track on fire again. This poor performance was overcome at the Indian Ocean Island Games held in Madagascar where Milazar won three gold medals in the 400m, 4 × 100 m and 4 × 400 m relay. He also won a silver medal in the 200 metres at these Games.

With strong wits and determination, Milazar bounced back at the Abuja CAA Super Grand Prix finishing third in 45.90 in 2008. He also achieved the standards needed to qualify for the Beijing Olympic Games but, did not pass the first round of the 400 metres.

In 2009, the Mauritian sprinter won a gold medal in the 400 metres at the Francophone Games held in Beirut, Lebanon. He achieved a time of 46.00 which was also his season's best. Moreover, he won a silver medal in the 4x100 relay and a bronze medal in the 4 × 400 m relay. As the captain of the Mauritian team, he demonstrated great sportsmanship during this international event which earned him the "Sportsman of the Year" award and a cash prize reward.

Personal bests

IAAF World Rankings

Awards

All Achievements in Athletics

References

External links
 
 

1975 births
Living people
Mauritian male sprinters
Athletes (track and field) at the 1996 Summer Olympics
Athletes (track and field) at the 2000 Summer Olympics
Athletes (track and field) at the 2004 Summer Olympics
Athletes (track and field) at the 2008 Summer Olympics
Olympic athletes of Mauritius
Athletes (track and field) at the 1998 Commonwealth Games
Athletes (track and field) at the 2002 Commonwealth Games
Athletes (track and field) at the 2006 Commonwealth Games
Athletes (track and field) at the 2010 Commonwealth Games
Commonwealth Games competitors for Mauritius
People from Rodrigues
Competitors at the 2001 Goodwill Games